Travis Rinker (born May 4, 1968, in Huntington, New York) is an American retired professional soccer player.

Playing career 
Rinker was named USISL defender of the year in 1994. In 1996, he was loaned to MetroStars.

Statistics

References

External links 
 Profile on MetroFanatic
 

1968 births
Living people
People from Huntington, New York
American soccer players
Soccer players from New York (state)
Association football defenders
University of Bridgeport alumni
Long Island Rough Riders players
New York Red Bulls players
Major League Soccer players
USL Second Division players
A-League (1995–2004) players
LA Galaxy draft picks